Live from Bonnaroo 2005 is a double disc live album from Mike Gordon and the Benevento-Russo Duo recorded live at the fourth annual Bonnaroo Music Festival in June 2005. It is a limited edition release, available only on the Internet via Gordon's own personal website and also as a download on the Live Phish website. 

It captures Gordon and the Duo performing a number of Benevento/Russo original songs, as well as solo songs from Gordon and a couple of songs from his band Phish, albeit in a very different instrumental format.

Track listing

Disc one
"9 x 9" - 7:53
"Sunny's Song" - 9:07
"My Pet Goat" - 19:11
"Best Reason to Buy the Sun" - 9:58
"Becky" - 7:13
"Welcome Red" - 9:42
"Foam" - 11:43

Disc two
"Hoe Down (Rodeo)" - 13:11
"Scratchitti" - 9:15
"The Beltless Buckler" - 18:12
"Mike's Song" - 23:16

Personnel
Mike Gordon – bass
Marco Benevento – keyboards
Joe Russo – drums
Gabby La La – sitar on "The Beltless Buckler"

External links
Mike hyphen Gordon's official site
Benevento/Russo Duo official home page
Benevento/Russo Duo Live Music Archive Download Page
Benevento/Russo Duo Fan Community

Benevento/Russo Duo albums
Mike Gordon albums
2006 live albums